Sherman Township is one of sixteen townships in Calhoun County, Iowa, United States.  As of the 2000 census, its population was 461.

History
Sherman Township was created circa 1868.

Geography
However, part of the Twin Lakes census-designated place is in the southern part of the township, surrounding North Twin Lake. According to the USGS, it contains three cemeteries: Leith, Memorial Park and Swedish.

References

External links
 City-Data.com

Townships in Calhoun County, Iowa
Townships in Iowa